Tarjei Vesaas (20 August 1897 – 15 March 1970) was a Norwegian poet and novelist. Vesaas is widely considered to be one of Norway's greatest writers of the twentieth century and perhaps its most important since World War II.

Biography
Vesaas was born in Vinje, Telemark, Norway to Olav Vesaas (1870–1951), a farmer and Signe Øygarden (1870-1953), a teacher.  He was the oldest of three sons.  He was guilt-ridden by his refusal to take over the family farm, and this guilt permeates much of his authorship. He spent much of his youth in solitude, seeking comfort and solace in nature. He married the writer Halldis Moren Vesaas (the daughter of Sven Moren and the sister of Sigmund Moren) and moved to Midtbø in his home district of Vinje in 1934. They had two children: a son, Olav Vesaas and a daughter, Guri Vesaas.   

His authorship covers almost 50 years, from 1923 to 1970. Written in Nynorsk, his work is characterized by simple, terse, and symbolic prose. His stories are often about simple rural people that undergo a severe psychological drama and who according to critics are described with immense psychological insight. Commonly dealing with themes such as death, guilt, angst, and other deep and intractable human emotions, the Norwegian natural landscape is a prevalent feature in his works. His debut was in 1923 with Children of Humans (Menneskebonn), but he had his breakthrough in 1934 with The Great Cycle (Det store spelet). His mastery of the nynorsk language, landsmål (see Norwegian language), has contributed to its acceptance as a medium of world class literature. 

A prolific author, he won a number of awards, including the Gyldendal's Endowment in 1943 and Dobloug Prize in 1957. He was awarded the Nordic Council's Literature Prize in 1963 for his novel The Ice Palace and the Venice Prize in 1953 for The Winds. He was nominated for the Nobel Prize in Literature on 57 occasions (once in 1946, and often multiple times every year between 1950 and 1970). 

The most famous of his works are The Ice Palace (Is-slottet), a story of two girls who build a profoundly strong relationship, and The Birds (Fuglane), a story of an adult of a simple childish mind, which through his tenderhearted empathy and imagination bears the role of a seer or writer. His novels have been translated into 28 languages. Several of his books have been translated into English – many of them published by Peter Owen Publishers– among them Spring Night, The Birds, Through Naked Branches, and The Ice Palace.

Awards
1943 – Gyldendal's Endowment (Gyldendals legat)
1946 – Melsom Prize (Melsom-prisen)
1957 – Dobloug Prize (Doblougprisen)
1964 – Nordic Council's Literature Prize (Nordisk råds litteraturpris)
1967 – Norwegian Booksellers' Prize (Bokhandlerprisen)

Selected works
Dei svarte hestane, novel 1928
The Great Cycle, Det store spelet, novel 1934
Women Call Home, Kvinnor ropar heim, novel 1935 (sequel to The great cycle)
The Seed, Kimen, novel 1940
The House in the Dark, Huset i mørkret, novel 1945
The Winds, Vindane, short stories 1952
Land of Hidden Fires, Løynde eldars land, poetry 1953
Spring Night, Vårnatt, novel 1954
The Birds, Fuglane, novel 1957
The Ice Palace, Is-slottet, novel 1963, published and translated into English by Peter Owen Publishers, London.
The Bridges, Bruene, novel 1966
The Boat in the Evening, Båten om Kvelden, novel 1968
Through Naked Branches: Selected Poems of Tarjei Vesaas, 2000

See also
Tarjei Vesaas' debutantpris

References

Other sources 
Kenneth Garnier Chapman (1970) Tarjei Vesaas (Twayne Publishers)

Related reading
Encyclopedia of World Literature in the 20th Century, vol. 4, ed. S. R. Serafin, 1999;
Columbia Dictionary of Modern European Literature, ed. Jean-Albert Bédé & William B. Edgerton, 1980;

1897 births
1970 deaths
People from Vinje
20th-century Norwegian novelists
Nynorsk-language writers
Dobloug Prize winners
Nordic Council Literature Prize winners
20th-century Norwegian poets
Norwegian male poets
Norwegian male novelists
20th-century Norwegian male writers